Lauro Ortega Martínez (June 8, 1910 – July 22, 1999) was a Mexican politician and veterinarian. He served as the Governor of Morelos from 1982 to 1988, succeeding Armando León Bejarano.

Ortega also served as the national President of the Institutional Revolutionary Party, Mexico's longtime ruling party, during the 1960s.

He died from heart attack on July 22, 1999, aged 89.

See also
List of people from Morelos, Mexico

References

1999 deaths
1910 births
Governors of Morelos
Presidents of the Institutional Revolutionary Party
Institutional Revolutionary Party politicians
People from Morelos
Politicians from Morelos
Politicians from Mexico City
Mexican veterinarians
Male veterinarians
20th-century Mexican politicians
National Autonomous University of Mexico alumni